Say Hello to Yesterday is a 1971 British romantic comedy-drama film directed by Canadian Alvin Rakoff, on whose original story the film is based. Starring Jean Simmons and Leonard Whiting, it is 'a fast moving account of ten hours in the life of a suburban housewife' and was made at Twickenham Studios and on location in London, Slough, Hampshire and Ascot railway station.

Plot
On a winter morning in an affluent suburb, the Woman – having just said goodbye to her stockbroker husband and their two young children – is going to London, shopping. She drives to the station which is shown as Cobham (referencing Cobham, Surrey or Cobham, Kent). Among the crowd, as she boards the train is the Boy. It is his birthday today and he's determined to make the day a different one.

The Boy moves up and down the crowded corridors. The Woman in her non-smoking compartment badly wants a cigarette and starts to scrape away a 'No Smoking' sign. The Boy is attracted by this middle class rebellion, pulls the sign off and presents it to her and tries to engage her in conversation.

Later, battling her way into a department store she finds he has followed her. Leaving the store, she thinks she has lost him. But he catches up with her on a crowded pavement. She tries to throw him off, he finds her again. She flees to her mother's apartment – followed by the Boy. The Woman is desperately embarrassed and tries to explain, but her mother treats the whole thing lightly and the Woman learns with surprise that her parents both had affairs with other people during the war. Mother says 'He's good for you. If you have an affair with that boy you'll regret it. On the other hand, if you don't have an affair with him you'll also regret it...' He tells an estate agent that he is a successful talent agent and gets the keys to an empty flat. The Woman and the Boy have sex together there. He tells her that he loves her and suggests they have an affair, but she declines his offer. She goes to London Victoria station and goes home.

Cast

Production
According to the director Alvin Rakoff, Say Hello to Yesterday was 'a 1970 Brief Encounter a picture designed purely for entertainment, with no morals or messages unless the public like to find them.'

Jean Simmons returned to London after a five-year absence to star in the film and shared the star billing with Franco Zeffirelli's Romeo, Leonard Whiting.

The original title was to have been Whatever Happened to Happy Endings? but Cinerama didn't want to use this title, partly because Jean Simmons had just starred in and been Academy award nominated for, the similarly titled The Happy Ending and partly because Cinerama feared that because Whatever Happened to Baby Jane? was a film of the era and there was a series of 'Whatever Happened...' films, they might be sued by other companies.

Music
Music was by Riz Ortolani most famous for his work on Mondo Cane. He was not the choice of the director who cut the film to the music of Joni Mitchell and Donovan's "Colours".

References

External links

1970 films
1970 comedy-drama films
British comedy-drama films
Casual sex in films
Films scored by Riz Ortolani
Films set in London
1970s English-language films
Films directed by Alvin Rakoff
1970s British films